Brussels South may refer to:

 Brussels-South railway station
 Brussels South Charleroi Airport